Mary Travers (Irish: Máire Ó Treabhair; b. 1962 – d. 8 April 1984) was a teacher who was shot dead in Belfast on 8 April 1984 by Provisional IRA gunmen trying to assassinate her father, Thomas, a Catholic magistrate. Mary Travers was about 22 at the time.

Attack
She, her parents and siblings had left St Brigid's Catholic Church in Derryvolgie Avenue in south Belfast when two gunmen opened fire. Mary Travers was shot once through the back and her father was shot six times. One gunman brought his gun to point-blank range at her mother's face and attempted to fire twice, but the gun jammed.

In a long letter published in The Irish Times in 1994, Thomas Travers wrote:

The IRA said in a statement that the killing of Mary Travers was accidental and that she had been killed by a bullet which passed through her father, hitting her in the back. The guns used in the attack had previously been used to assassinate Judge William Doyle in similar circumstances, in January 1983. Sinn Féin spokesperson Danny Morrison described the killing of Mary Travers as "tragic and regrettable" but said the targeting of her father was "directly related to the political situation in Ireland".

Arrest
Mary McArdle, then aged 19, was arrested shortly after the attack and charged "after two hand guns, a grey wig and a black sock concealed in bandages were found strapped to her thighs."  Two months later, 33-year-old IRA member Joseph Patrick Haughey was arrested and charged in connection with the attack. At the trial two years later, McArdle was found guilty and received "a life sentence for her role in the murder of Mary Travers and an 18-year concurrent sentence for the attempted murder of Mr Travers". Haughey was acquitted due to lack of forensic evidence and doubts over his identity, although Thomas Travers had positively identified him.

McArdle served 14 years in prison before being released early under the terms of the Belfast Agreement.

Aftermath
Retired detective superintendent Alan Simpson wrote in the Belfast Telegraph on 11 June 2011 that he believed the shooting of the Travers family was revenge for a successful prosecution in the murder of a prison warder, William McConnell. He went on to say that "It is hard to believe that Sinn Féin are acting other than disingenuously by appointing Mary McArdle to a position carrying a taxpayer-funded salary of £78,000 – three times what a senior nurse in one of our hospitals would earn."

Haughey was later charged in connection with the murder. However, Haughey was acquitted after doubt was cast over Mr Travers' identification of the gunman. Twenty years later it was claimed that he was a long-time double agent for the British secret service (see Freddie Scappaticci). Both men have been closely linked to Sinn Féin President, Gerry Adams.

Associated Special Adviser Appointment controversy
Mary McArdle was released under the terms of the Belfast Agreement. In 2011, McArdle was appointed Ministerial Special Adviser to Sinn Féin Culture Minister Carál Ní Chuilín, herself a former PIRA paramilitary who served four years in prison for firearm possession, possession of explosives with the intent to endanger life, and attempted murder. This move led to outrage that a convicted IRA murderer could hold such a post. Mary Travers' sister, Ann, called on McArdle to resign. In response, McArdle told the Andersonstown News that the killing was "a tragic mistake." McArdle's statement was rebutted by Mary Travers' sister, Ann, who stated:

Her brother, Paul Travers, who now lives in Australia, told the Belfast Telegraph in July 2011:  Paul Travers made an open appeal to Sinn Féin to work with the Historical Enquiries Team and determine who killed his sister:

In June 2013, the Northern Ireland Assembly passed a bill to bar anyone with a serious conviction from being named a special political adviser (SPAD). The bill was put forward by Jim Allister who was inspired by Ann Travers' campaign. Allister said "She (Ann Travers) has done right and done well by her late sister and father, and we all owe her a great debt of gratitude." About the bill, Ann Travers said:

See also
 Murder of Jean McConville
 Gillian Johnston
 Eamon Ryan (IRA murder victim)
 Murder of Thomas Oliver
 Murder of James Curran

References

Bibliography
 Lost Lives:The stories of the men, women and children who died as a result of the Northern Ireland troubles, McKittrick, Kelters, Feeney, Thompson, 1999, (2006). .

External links
BBC Spotlight IRA Victim Speaks Out
BBC Spotlight IRA Victim Speaks Out
Tunein.com
BBC article
BBC.co.uk

People killed by the Provisional Irish Republican Army
Murder victims from Northern Ireland
People murdered in Belfast
1984 murders in the United Kingdom
1984 in Northern Ireland
The Troubles in Belfast
Female murder victims
Assassinated educators
April 1984 events in the United Kingdom
Deaths by firearm in Northern Ireland
Deaths by person in Northern Ireland